Kano may refer to:

Places
Kano State, a state in Northern Nigeria
Kano (city), a city in Nigeria, and the capital of Kano State
Kingdom of Kano, a Hausa kingdom between the 10th and 14th centuries
Sultanate of Kano, a Hausa kingdom between the 14th and 19th centuries
Kano Emirate, a 19th-century Islamic state

People

Mononym 
Kano (British musician) (born 1985), British rapper
Kano (comics) (born 1973), Spanish comic book artist
Kano (Japanese musician), Japanese musician and virtual YouTuber

Surname 
, Japanese founder of Judo
Aminu Kano (1920–1983), Nigerian politician
David Kano (actor) (born 1987), American actor, writer and producer
, Japanese comedian and singer
, Japanese politician
, Japanese volleyball player
, Japanese developer of the Kano model
, Japanese footballer
Thea Kano (born 1965), American conductor
, Japanese politician

Fictional characters 
Kano (Mortal Kombat), from the Mortal Kombat franchise
Kano Kirishima, from the visual novel Air.
Kano, the leader of "Bad Company", a 2000AD comic strip
David Kano, from Space: 1999

Other uses 
 Kano (band), an early-1980s Italian dance music group
 Kano (film), a 2014 Taiwanese baseball film directed by Umin Boya
 KANO (FM), a radio station (89.1 FM) in Hilo, Hawaii
 Kano baseball team, a defunct Taiwanese baseball team
 Kano Chronicle, an account of the history of the Hausa people
 Kano Computing, a British computer hardware and software company
 Kano model, a theory of new product development and customer satisfaction
 Kanō school, a school of Japanese painting
 Kano, an arcade game by Glitchers

See also
Kanoo, an Arabic family name

Japanese-language surnames